The 2006 World Championship of Ski Mountaineering was the third World Championship of Ski Mountaineering sanctioned by the International Council for Ski Mountaineering Competitions (ISMC), held in the Italian Province of Cuneo from February 27 to March 4, 2006.

The participating athletes were from 33 nations. Because the relay event for the "Senior" athletes had to be canceled to bad snow conditions, there was consequently no combined ranking.

Results

Nation ranking and medals 

(all age groups)

Vertical race 
Event held at Crissolo on February 28, 2008

 altitude of the starting point: 1,365m
 distance: 4.7 km lange Strecke
 altitude difference (ascent): 1000m

List of the best 10 participants by gender:

Women

Men

Team 
Event held at Crissolo on March 1, 2006

 altitude of the starting point: 1,725m
 highest altitude: 3,019m
 distance (long distance): 20.3 km
 altitude difference:
 ascent: 2,088m
 downhill: 2,088m

List of the best 10 teams by gender:

Women

Men

Individual (canceled) 
Route:
 distance: 17.1 km
 highest altitude: 2,400m
 altitude difference:
 ascent: 1,740m
 downhill: 1,750m

Relay
Event held in Artesina on March 4, 2006

 distance: 1.92 km 
 altitude of starting point: 1,363m
 highest altitude: 1,503m
 altitude difference:
 ascent: 140m
 downhill: 140m

List of the best 10 relay teams by gender:

Women

Men

References

External links 
 Cuneo 2006

2006
World Championship Of Ski Mountaineering, 2006
International sports competitions hosted by Italy
Sport in Piedmont
World Championship Of Ski Mountaineering, 2006
Skiing competitions in Italy